Natalie Anne Coughlin Hall (born August 23, 1982) is an American former competition swimmer and twelve-time Olympic medalist. While attending the University of California, Berkeley, she became the first woman ever to swim the 100-meter backstroke (long course) in less than one minute—ten days before her 20th birthday in 2002. At the 2008 Summer Olympics, she became the first U.S. female athlete in modern Olympic history to win six medals in one Olympiad, and the first woman ever to win a 100-meter backstroke gold in two consecutive Olympics. At the 2012 Summer Olympics, she earned a bronze medal in the 4×100-meter freestyle relay.

Coughlin's success has earned her the World Swimmer of the Year Award once and American Swimmer of the Year Award three times. She has won a total of sixty medals in major international competition, twenty-five gold, twenty-two silver, and thirteen bronze spanning the Olympics, the World, the Pan Pacific Championships, and the Pan American Games.

Early years
Coughlin was born in Vallejo, California, the daughter of Jim and Zennie Coughlin. She is of Irish and one quarter Filipino ancestry. Coughlin first began swimming at Vallejo Aquatics Club when she was 8 years old, where she was coached by Tuffy Williams. She attended St. Catherine of Siena School in Vallejo, for kindergarten through eighth grade, and then Carondelet High School in Concord, California. While in high school in 1998, she became the first swimmer to qualify for the Summer National in all fourteen events. Coughlin broke two individual national high school records in the 200-yard individual medley (1:58.45) and the 100-yard backstroke (52.86). She graduated from Carondelet High School in 2000.

College career
Coughlin attended the University of California, Berkeley, where she swam for coach Teri McKeever's California Golden Bears swimming and diving team in National Collegiate Athletic Association (NCAA) competition from 2001 to 2003. During her three years as a Cal Bears swimmer, she won eleven individual NCAA national championships, and a twelfth NCAA relay title. She was recognized as the NCAA Swimmer of the Year for three consecutive years, and she was a two-time recipient of the Honda Sports Award for Swimming and Diving, recognizing her as the outstanding college female swimmer in 2001–02 and 2002–03. Sports Illustrated magazine named her its college Female Athlete of the Year. Coughlin was inducted into the Cal Athletic Hall of Fame in 2014. Coughlin graduated from Berkeley with a degree in psychology in the spring of 2005.

International career

2001–2003
At the ninth World Aquatics Championships in Fukuoka, Japan, Coughlin won three medals—one gold, one silver, and one bronze. She won her gold medal in the 100-meter backstroke with Diana Mocanu (Romania) taking the silver and Antje Buschschulte (Germany) taking the bronze. Coughlin won her silver medal in the women's 4×100-meter medley relay, teaming up with Megan Quann, Mary Descenza, and Erin Phenix; the Australians won the gold (Calub, Jones, Thomas, Ryan). Coughlin won her bronze medal in the 50-meter backstroke; fellow American Haley Cope won gold and Antje Buschschulte won the silver.

At the ninth Pan Pacific Championships in Yokohama, Japan, Coughlin won six medals—four golds and two silvers. Coughlin won one of her gold medals in the women's 100-meter backstroke with a time of 59.72, and another in the women's 100-meter butterfly with a time of 57.88. Coughlin won her third gold medal in the women's 100-meter freestyle with a time of 53.99. She won her fourth gold medal in the women's 4×200-meter freestyle relay with Elizabeth Hill, Diana Munz, and Lindsay Benko. She won her silver medals as a member of the second-place U.S. relay teams in the 4×100-meter freestyle and 4×100-meter medley events.

At the tenth World Aquatics Championships in Barcelona, Spain, Coughlin won two medals, including a gold and a silver. Coughlin won her gold medal in the women's 4×100-meter freestyle relay and a silver medal in the 4×100-medley relay.

2004 Athens Summer Olympics

Coughlin won the gold medal at the 2004 Olympics in the women's 100-meter backstroke event and won a silver medal as a member of the U.S. women's 4×100-meter freestyle relay team with Kara Lynn Joyce, Amanda Weir and Jenny Thompson. She also broke a world record and won gold as a member of the 4×200-meter freestyle relay, a silver in the 4×100-meter medley relay, and a bronze in the 100-meter freestyle.

2005–2006
At the eleventh World Aquatics Championships in Montreal, Quebec, Coughlin won five medals, including a gold and 2 silvers and 2 bronzes. Coughlin won a gold medal in the women's 200 m freestyle relay and silver medals in the 100 meter medley relay and the 100 m freestyle. She also won bronze medals in the 100 m backstroke and the 100m freestyle relay.

Coughlin worked as an in-studio host for MSNBC during the 2006 Winter Olympics in Turin, Italy.

2007 World Aquatics Championships

At the 2007 World Aquatics Championships, Coughlin won five medals: two gold, two silver, and one bronze. In her first event, the 4×100-meter freestyle relay, Coughlin won a silver medal along with Lacey Nymeyer, Amanda Weir, and Kara Lynn Joyce. The following day, in the 100-meter butterfly, she placed third in the final with a time of 57.34, an American record. In the 100-meter backstroke final, held the following day, she broke her own world record set in 2002 with a time of 59.44. After a day of rest, Coughlin was back in the pool to swim the lead-off leg in the 4×200-meter freestyle relay. Swimming in lane eight, Coughlin set the American record with a time of 1:56.43, to break Katie Hoff's one-day-old record of 1:57.09. Dana Vollmer, Lacey Nymeyer, and Katie Hoff each extended the lead and the final time of 7:50.09 was a world record. The following day, Coughlin finished in 4th place in the 100-meter freestyle despite setting the championship record in the semi-finals. In her last event, the 4×100-meter medley relay, Coughlin won a silver medal along with Tara Kirk, Rachel Komisarz, and Lacey Nymeyer.

2008 Beijing Summer Olympics

In Coughlin's second Olympics appearance, at Beijing in 2008, she became the first American female athlete to win six medals in one Olympics. She was elected joint captain of the US women's swimming team together with five-time Olympian Dara Torres and four-time Olympian Amanda Beard. Coughlin won the gold medal in the 100-meter backstroke at those Olympiads, the inaugural woman to successfully defend a gold medal standing in that event. her world records was surpassed in the semi final by Kirsty Coventry, would take the silver. Standing on the medal platform, her lip was still bleeding having bitten it during the race to distract her from the pain in her legs. She won a silver medal in the 4×100-meter freestyle relay, swimming with Lacey Nymeyer, Kara Lynn Joyce and Dara Torres, and also won bronze medals in the 200-meter individual medley, 4×200-meter freestyle relay, and the 100-meter freestyle. She won a silver medal in her final race in the 4×100-meter medley relay swimming with Rebecca Soni, Christine Magnuson, and Dara Torres.

2010 US Summer Nationals and Pan Pacific Championships

After taking an 18-month hiatus from swimming, Coughlin returned to competition at the 2010 Conoco Phillips Summer Nationals. Coughlin qualified for Pan Pacific in the 100-meter backstroke with a time of 1:00.14.

Before racing at the Pan Pacs, Coughlin, along with Amanda Beard, was elected co-captain of Team USA once again. In the finals of the 100-meter freestyle, Natalie Coughlin won the gold, making a new Pan Pacific record (53.67). In the finals of the 100-meter backstroke, Coughlin finished third (59.70) behind Australia's Emily Seebohm and Japan's Aya Terakawa. Coughlin won two more golds when starting off both the 4×100-meter freestyle relay and the 4×100-meter medley relay.

2011 World Aquatics Championships

At the 14th World Aquatics Championships in Shanghai, China, Coughlin won three medals–one gold, one silver, and one bronze. She won a gold medal in the women's 4×100-meter medley relay with fellow Americans Rebecca Soni, Dana Vollmer, and Missy Franklin with a time of 3:52.36. She won a silver medal in the women's 4×100-meter freestyle relay with fellow Americans Missy Franklin, Jessica Hardy, and Dana Vollmer with a time of 3:34.47 with the Netherlands touching first with a time of 3:33.96. She won a bronze medal in the women's 100-meter backstroke, her only individual medal at these championships, with a 59.15. Coughlin led for the entire race, when in the last couple meters, Zhao Jing and Anastasia Zueva edged her out.

2012 London Summer Olympics

At the 2012 United States Olympic Trials in Omaha, Nebraska, the U.S. qualifying event for the Olympics, the 29-year-old veteran Coughlin found herself in competition with a younger generation of American swimmers. In order to qualify for the U.S. team in a given individual event, swimmers are required to finish among the top two. In the finals of the 100-meter backstroke, she finished third behind teenagers Missy Franklin and Rachel Bootsma, and finished seventh in the 100-meter butterfly. Coughlin also competed in the 100-meter freestyle, and finished sixth, qualifying to compete as a member of the U.S. women's team in the preliminaries of the 4×100-meter freestyle relay.

At the 2012 Summer Olympics in London, she swam in the qualifying round of the 4×100-meter freestyle relay, and did not swim in the 4×100-meter final, but earned a bronze medal when the U.S. team placed third in the final. It was her twelfth Olympic medal, tying the record previously set by American swimmers Jenny Thompson and Dara Torres for the most career Olympic medals won by a female U.S. athlete.

2013 World Aquatics Championships
At the 2013 Phillips 66 National Championships, which also served as the selection meet for the World Championships, Coughlin decided to only take up the sprint freestyles and swam the 50 and 100-meter freestyle events. Coughlin qualified for the 50-meter freestyle and the 4×100-meter freestyle relay. Coughlin finished first in the 50-meter freestyle with a 24.97, just ahead of 16-year-old Simone Manuel, who swam a 25.01. With the first-place finish in the 50-meter freestyle, Coughlin ensured herself a relay spot since she had finished 5th in the 100-meter freestyle, with a time of 54.04.

She won a gold medal at the event on the first night of swimming competition in the 4×100 freestyle relay. She went second for team USA and swam her leg in 52.98 seconds; she was one of only 6 women in the field of 32 to break the 53-second barrier.

In her final triumph, two months before her 33rd birthday in 2015, she set an American women's record of 27.51 seconds in the 50-meter backstroke.

Post-swimming career and media appearances
Coughlin was the spokeswoman for C20 Coconut Water.

One of Coughlin's favorite hobbies is cooking. During the 2008 Summer Olympics, she was invited to prepare a Chinese-themed dish on Today. She has appeared as a judge on Iron Chef America. She appeared on Food Network's Chopped Sport Stars episode that first aired on September 3, 2013.

Coughlin competed in season 9 of Dancing with the Stars with season 1 professional champion, Alec Mazo. She was eliminated on the fifth episode.

Coughlin appeared in the 2012 Sports Illustrated Swimsuit Issue. She has also written a book called Golden Girl.

In 2013, Coughlin appeared in Chopped where she lost in the final round to Danica Patrick. While on the show she mentioned she grows a vegetable and herb garden in her backyard, as well as raising backyard chickens.

Coughlin appeared on one of the covers for the 2015 ESPN The Magazine The Body Issue and in July/August 2016, the cover of Self (magazine)'s Olympics themed issue.

Also in 2015, Coughlin became a brand ambassador and investor in a frozen food company, Luvo Inc.

In 2017 she became a partner in Gaderian Wines, a winemaking operation in Napa Valley.

Personal life
In April 2009, Coughlin married Ethan Hall, the Crow Canyon Sharks swim coach. The couple welcomed a daughter on October 17, 2018. Coughlin announced May 27, 2020, via Instagram she was expecting a second child in a few months. On October 27, 2020, she posted a picture on Instagram of her newborn son Ozzie.

Personal bests

Long course (50 m pool)

Short course (25 m pool)

  United States open record

See also

 List of multiple Olympic gold medalists
 List of multiple Olympic medalists
 List of multiple Summer Olympic medalists
 List of multiple Olympic medalists at a single Games
 List of Olympic medalists in swimming (women)
 List of United States records in swimming
 List of World Aquatics Championships medalists in swimming (women)
 List of world records in swimming
 World record progression 100 metres backstroke
 World record progression 100 metres butterfly
 World record progression 100 metres individual medley
 World record progression 200 metres backstroke
 World record progression 4 × 100 metres medley relay
 World record progression 4 × 200 metres freestyle relay

References

External links

 
 
 
 
 
 

1982 births
Living people
American female backstroke swimmers
American female butterfly swimmers
American female freestyle swimmers
American female medley swimmers
American people of Irish descent
American sportspeople of Filipino descent
American sportswomen
21st-century American psychologists
California Golden Bears women's swimmers
World record holders in swimming
Medalists at the FINA World Swimming Championships (25 m)
Medalists at the 2004 Summer Olympics
Medalists at the 2008 Summer Olympics
Medalists at the 2012 Summer Olympics
Olympic bronze medalists for the United States in swimming
Olympic gold medalists for the United States in swimming
Olympic silver medalists for the United States in swimming
Participants in American reality television series
People from Concord, California
People from Lafayette, California
Sportspeople from Vallejo, California
Swimmers at the 2004 Summer Olympics
Swimmers at the 2008 Summer Olympics
Swimmers at the 2012 Summer Olympics
World Aquatics Championships medalists in swimming
Swimmers at the 2015 Pan American Games
Pan American Games gold medalists for the United States
Pan American Games medalists in swimming
Medalists at the 2015 Pan American Games
20th-century American women
21st-century American women